The girls' doubles event of the 2017 BWF World Junior Championships was held on 16–22 October. The defending champions were Sayaka Hobara and Nami Matsuyama from Japan.

Seeds 

  Kim Min-ji / Seong Ah-yeong (fourth round)
  Baek Ha-na / Lee Yu-rim (champion)
  Agatha Imanuela / Siti Fadia Silva Ramadhanti (fourth round)
  Jauza Fadhila Sugiarto / Ribka Sugiarto (final)
  Bengisu Ercetin / Nazlican Inci (quarterfinals)
  Pearly Tan Koong Le / Toh Ee Wei (fourth round)
  Supisara Paewsampran / Kwanchanok Sudjaipraparat (fourth round)
  Li Zi-qing / Teng Chun-hsun (quarterfinals)

  Serena Kani / Pitha Haningtyas Mentari (second round)
  Xia Yuting / Zhang Shuxian (semifinals)
  Wiktoria Dabczynska / Aleksandra Goszczynska (third round)
  Vivien Sandorhazi /  Tereza Svabikova (third round)
  Rin Iwanaga / Natsu Saito (third round)
  Maria Delcheva / Hristomira Popovska (second round)
  Cheng Yu-pei / Liang Chia-wei (fourth round)
  Vimala Heriau / Léonice Huet (fourth round)

Draw

Finals

Top half

Section 1

Section 2

Section 3

Section 4

Bottom half

Section 5

Section 6

Section 7

Section 8

References

2017 BWF World Junior Championships